Accous is a commune in the Pyrénées-Atlantiques department in the Nouvelle-Aquitaine region in southwestern France.

Geography

Location
Accous is located some 30 km south of Oloron-Sainte-Marie in the Aspe Valley, one of the three valleys of the High-Béarn, the other valleys being the Ossau Valley in the east and Barétous valley in the west. From the Spanish border on its southern edge, it stretches along Le Labadie river to the point where it joins the Gave d'Aspe. From this river junction, the Gave d'Aspe forms the western border of the rest of the commune which extends a further 10 kilometres to the east with the Lac du Montagnon at the northeastern edge.

Access
The commune is accessed from the north by the E7 motorway. This highway follows the western border of the commune along the Gave d'Aspe then crosses the narrow neck of the commune before continuing to the Spanish border near Candanchu. To access Accous village it is necessary to follow one of a number of country roads - the Daban Athas road probably being the most direct. Apart from country roads within the commune there is no other road access.

Hydrography
The commune is traversed by some tributaries of the Gave d'Oloron, the Besse stream and the Gave d'Aspe, as well as tributaries of the latter such as the Gave Lescun (itself joined in the commune by the Labadie creek) and the Berthe (Accous is fed by the torrent of Araille).

The Cotcharas stream and its tributary, the Congaets stream also flow in the territory of Accous, as tributaries of the Gave d'Aydius, the Gave de Bouren and the Sahun stream.

Relief
Accous is dominated by the Poey, a conical hill covered with ferns, culminating at 652 m.
The Poey is of volcanic origin and is made of ophites.
These green and harsh volcanic rocks from the Triassic belong to dolerites. They have resisted the erosion of glaciers and torrential rivers.
This is the reason why the Poey of Accous markedly emerges from the plain.

Localities and hamlets

 Borde Apiou
 Appatie
 Arapoup (Bois d')
 Aulet north
 Aumet
 Balet
 Castet de Bergout
 Borde Boudrux
 Bouhaben
 Cabane de Cambou
 Campagnet
 Camy
 Camy Lapassatet
 Candarrameigt
 Casala
 Borde de Casteigbou
 Borde Castillou
 Chapelet
 Borde de Couyepetrou
 Cabanes de la Cuarde
 Colonne Despourins
 Embielle
 l’Estanguet
 Fontaine de l’Espugna
 Gouaillard
 Guiraute
 Jouers
 Borde Laborde
 Labourdette
 Lagahe
 Lalheve
 Cabane du Lapassa
 Borde Laplacette
 Borde Larraux
 Borde Larré
 Lauda
 Lhers
 Lourtica (Col de)
 Borde Lousteau
 Borde Maria
 Mariet
 Moulia Jean-Baptiste
 Borde Mirassou
 Nouque
 la Palue
 Pelet
 Cabane de Pourcibo
 Borde de Soudious
 Borde Soule
 Borde Souperbie
 Cabanes de Souperret
 Borde Suza

Neighbouring communes

Toponymy
The name Accous appears in the following forms:
Aspa Luca (appeared in the Antonine Itinerary)
Achoss and Achost (1154, Jean-Louis Vignau)
Acos (1247, Fors of Aspe)
Aquos d'Aspe (1376 Béarnais military inspection)
Aquos (1385, Census of Béarn)
Abadie de Cos (1538, Reformation of Béarn)
Sanctus Martinus de Acous (1608, Insinuations of the Diocese of Oloron)
Acous (1750 on the Cassini Map and 1801 Bulletin des lois).

The name of the commune in Gascon is Acós.

Brigitte Jobbé-Duval hypothesises that Accous originated from Acca or Acco, a woman's name mentioned in the inscriptions of Spain.

The name Appatie (cf. Basque Aphatea) came from the Lay Abbey of Jouers through corruption of the word Abbadie (Abadie in standard Gascon). Note that in the Aspe Valley the voiceless consonants of Latin are preserved. This fief was a vassal of the Viscounts of Béarn.

Le Bois d'Arapoup is attested in 1863 in the Topographical Dictionary.

Aület is mentioned in the form Aulet in 1863 by the Topographical Dictionary.

Lhers is also cited in the dictionary.

The name La Berthe, a tributary of the Gave d'Aspe, is cited in the dictionary of 1863.

Despourrins (The Hill of) is also mentioned in 1863 in the Topographical Dictionary as a name taken from the poet Cyprien Despourrins who was buried there.

Izaure was a farm mentioned by Paul Raymond with the spellings:
Usaure (1376, Béarnais military inspection F. 76),
Ixaure, Isaurs, and Isaure (1385, Census of Béarn F. 73).

Jouers /juèrs/  was formerly Joertz (1345, Homages of Béarn), probably a metathesis of a Basque word Oïhartz a derivative of Oihan meaning 'forest'. It is found in the spelling Joers (1345) then Jouers (in 1712), and again Joers (1863).

The Col de Lourtica is the name of a hill between the communes of Accous and Aydius.

Saint-Christau was a chapel, mentioned by the dictionary of 1863.

Tillabé was a place in Accous reported by the dictionary in 1863 and also mentioned in the 18th century 2 in the form Le Tillaber (record of the proceedings of Accous). Paul Raymond said that Tillabé "was the place of meeting of the aldermen of the Aspe valley".

History
Paul Raymond noted that the commune had a Lay Abbey, a vassal of the Viscounts of Béarn. In 1385, there were 74 "fires". Accous was the capital of the Aspe valley.

Administration

List of Successive Mayors of Accous

Inter-communality
The town is part of five inter-communal organisations:
the community of communes of Haut Béarn
the Energy union in the Pyrenees-Atlantiques
the Television union of Oloron - Aspe Valley
the inter-communal union to aid education in the Aspe Valley
the joint union of Upper-Béarn.

Twinning
Accous has twinning associations with:
 Valle de Hecho (Spain) since 1978.

Population

Economy
The economy of the town is primarily oriented toward agriculture and animal husbandry. The cheese-making farms are also one of the resources of the commune, which is part of the Appellation d'origine contrôlée (AOC) zone designation of Ossau-Iraty cheese.

The Toyal plant (a subsidiary of Toyo Aluminium, which produces aluminum powders and pigments, and anti-corrosive coatings), located at the edge of the commune, provides income to Accous through business tax, making of it the richest communes in the valley. This activity has created hundreds of jobs in the valley.

The median net disposible income per household was €19,610 in 2017, which is lower than the figure for the Pyrénées-Atlantiques department (€21,250).

Sights
Accous has a number of old houses and farms registered as historical monuments. These are:
House at Rue de Baix (16th century)
House 1 at Rue de Haut (17th century)
House 2 at Rue de Haut (17th century)
House at Rue Madrih (18th century)

The Accous railway station on the Pau to Canfranc line has been closed to traffic since 1970.

The eco-museum of the Aspe valley is located in an old cheese factory. The manufacturing techniques of making mountain cheese and local culinary traditions are highlighted in the displays.

Several churches in the commune have been listed as historical monuments. These are:
Chapel of Saint-Saturnin (12th century)
Parish Church of Saint-Martin (1358) The church contains two historical objects. These are:
4 Candlesticks (18th century)
Retable and Statuettes on the main Altar (18th century)
Chapel of Saint-Jean-Baptiste at Lhers (1707)
Chapel of Saint-Christophe at Aület was built at the end of the 18th century, rebuilt at the end of the 19th century, then restored in the 20th century.

Gallery
Church of Saint Martin

The chapel of Saint-Saturnin at Jouers

The Chapel of Saint-Christau at Aület was rebuilt in the 17th century near three miraculous fountains. Only the first remains, on the east side, consisting of a medieval stone basin and cover. Bathing there permits the casting away of evil spells and to cure fevers, sciatica and epilepsy. It has been renovated.

There is also an Abbey of the order of Norbertine in Accous.

Accous is on the route of the "via Tolosane": Latin name of one of the four trails in France for pilgrimage to St-Jacques-de-Compostolla. The via Tolosane starts in Arles via Toulouse (hence the name) to the Spanish border at Col du Somport.

Environmental heritage
Some peaks in the commune are:
Isabe peak 2463 m
Permayou peak: 2344 m
Mardas 2188 m
Montagne de Isaye 2173 m
Montagne de Liard 2169 m
Bergon peak: 2148 m
Montagne de Ponce 2028 m

Facilities

Education
The town has a primary school, the école du bourg.

Sport and sports structures
Accous is a famous spot for paragliding in the Pyrenees. There are two paragliding schools in the commune:
Ascendance and
Air attitude

Accommodations
Accous also has communal lodgings.

Notable People linked to the common

Cyprien Despourrins was born and died in Accous (1698-1759). He was a Béarnais poet using the Occitan language and author of famous and iconic songs of Béarn.
Bernard Lacoarret (early 18th century), a native of Accous, a lawyer at the Parliament of Navarre.
Henri Lillaz, born in 1881 in Sainte-Colombe-lès-Vienne and died in 1949 in Paris. He was a politician and general counsel for Accous from 1919 to 1937
Bertrand Lacaste (1897–1994), was born and died in Accous. He was Bishop of Oran from 1946 to 1972.

Other pictures

See also
Communes of the Pyrénées-Atlantiques department

External links
Accous on Géoportail, National Geographic Institute (IGN) website 
Acous on the 1750 Cassini Map

References

Communes of Pyrénées-Atlantiques